Paul Dallow  is a former New Zealand athletics representative.  He was educated at St Peter's College, Auckland where he commenced his interest in athletics.  He represented New Zealand as a hurdler. He represented New Zealand in 1960 in Melbourne in the 120, 220 and 440 Yards Hurdles; in 1962 he represented New Zealand at the Empire Games held in Perth in the 120 and 440 Yards Hurdles.

References

Living people
People educated at St Peter's College, Auckland
New Zealand male hurdlers
Athletes (track and field) at the 1962 British Empire and Commonwealth Games
Commonwealth Games competitors for New Zealand
Athletes from Auckland
Year of birth missing (living people)